Barnsdall is a city in Osage County, Oklahoma, United States. The population was 1,034 at the 2020 census, a decline of 21.9 percent from the figure of 1,325 recorded in 2000.

History
The town was founded in 1905 and originally named Bigheart, for the Osage Chief James Bigheart. It was initially a 160-acre site along the Midland Valley Railroad in March 1905. The railroad opened Bigheart Station in September 1905 and the Bigheart Post Office opened in January 1906.  The town was exempted from the Osage allotment, so lots could be sold to anyone. Lots were auctioned in May 1906. The first newspaper, the Bigheart Star, first appeared in 1906.

Joshua Cosden built the Southwest Refining Company oil refinery in 1910. He sold it to Stone and Webster of Boston, Massachusetts in 1917. The Barnsdall Oil Company had discovered the nearby Bigheart (later Barnsdall) oilfield in 1916. The Barnsdall Oil Company, bought the refinery in 1921.  The town was renamed on January 1, 1922 in honor of Mr. Barnsdall.

The town of Barnsdall experienced a tornado in April 1911, a major fire in March 1913 and a flood in September 1915. Despite these calamities, the population increased from 307 in 1910 to 2,099 in 1920. That proved to be the high point of population in the town.

Barnsdall Refining Company renamed itself Bareco Oil Company in 1940. It ceased refining oil in 1946 and began producing microcrystalline waxes that year. Petrolite Corporation (now part of Baker Hughes Inc.) bought Bareco and has continued to operate the plant. Henry L. Doherty bought the holdings of Theodore N. Barnsdall, founder of Barnsdall Oil Company, in 1912.

The Midland Valley trackage both north and south of Barnsdall has since been abandoned, the southern portion in 2000.  At least some of the route south of Barnsdall has been converted into a rail trail.

Geography

Climate

Events

Barnsdall's annual Bigheart Day is held The Saturday before Memorial Day. It centered on a parade and other events, such as:
 Fishing Tournament at Lake Waxhoma. Ages 4–12.
 Frog Race and Turtle Race after the fishing tournament.
 Carnival; depends on the city budget.
 Tricycle races.
 Live music. Bands that have played, Celestial Impulse (disbanded), Accusing of the Believing (disbanded), and Pake Mackentire
 Street vendors.
 Parade at noon.
 Alumni panther football game.
 Street dance; usually 7pm - Midnight.
 Alumni Basketball game.

Demographics

As of the census of 2000, there were 1,325 people, 542 households, and 357 families residing in the city. The population density was 2,195.3 people per square mile (852.6/km2). There were 630 housing units at an average density of 1,043.8 per square mile (405.4/km2). The racial makeup of the city was 74.26% White, 15.62% Native American, 0.30% Asian, 0.23% from other races, and 9.58% from two or more races. Hispanic or Latino of any race were 1.81% of the population.

There were 542 households, out of which 28.4% had children under the age of 18 living with them, 53.7% were married couples living together, 9.0% had a female householder with no husband present, and 34.1% were non-families. 31.7% of all households were made up of individuals, and 16.6% had someone living alone who was 65 years of age or older. The average household size was 2.38 and the average family size was 3.00.

In the city, the population was spread out, with 24.5% under the age of 18, 8.4% from 18 to 24, 24.6% from 25 to 44, 22.8% from 45 to 64, and 19.8% who were 65 years of age or older. The median age was 40 years. For every 100 females, there were 85.6 males. For every 100 females age 18 and over, there were 80.4 males.

The median income for a household in the city was $25,598, and the median income for a family was $34,934. Males had a median income of $31,731 versus $18,472 for females. The per capita income for the city was $13,435. About 8.0% of families and 11.0% of the population were below the poverty line, including 9.1% of those under age 18 and 15.9% of those age 65 or over.

Notable people
Anita Bryant (born, 1940), the singer and political activist, known for anti-gay activism, was born in Barnsdall.  She was Miss America runner-up in 1958.
Clark Gable, movie star famous for his role in "Gone With the Wind", came to Barnsdall with his father for a short while when the town was in the oil business. The native stone shotgun house where he resided on West Walnut Street still stands. Clark was also noted to sing in a quartet while he lived in Bigheart (Barnsdall).

Attractions

Barnsdall has two properties listed on the National Register of Historic Places listings in Osage County, Oklahoma: 
 The Bank of Bigheart, which is the town's oldest commercial building
 The Barnsdall Main Street Well Site, an oil well in the middle of Main Street.

In addition, the Woolaroc Ranch Historic District, 8 miles east of the junction of State Highway 11 and State Highway 123, is considered to be in Barnsdall.

References

External links
 Encyclopedia of Oklahoma History and Culture - Barnsdall

Cities in Osage County, Oklahoma
Cities in Oklahoma
Tulsa metropolitan area
Populated places established in 1905
1905 establishments in Indian Territory